This article is about the particular significance of the year 1775 to Wales and its people.

Incumbents
Lord Lieutenant of Anglesey - Sir Nicholas Bayly, 2nd Baronet
Lord Lieutenant of Brecknockshire and Monmouthshire – Charles Morgan of Dderw
Lord Lieutenant of Caernarvonshire - Thomas Wynn
Lord Lieutenant of Cardiganshire – Wilmot Vaughan, 1st Earl of Lisburne
Lord Lieutenant of Carmarthenshire – George Rice
Lord Lieutenant of Denbighshire - Richard Myddelton  
Lord Lieutenant of Flintshire - Sir Roger Mostyn, 5th Baronet 
Lord Lieutenant of Glamorgan – John Stuart, Lord Mountstuart
Lord Lieutenant of Merionethshire - William Vaughan (until 12 April); Sir Watkin Williams-Wynn, 4th Baronet (from 10 June)
Lord Lieutenant of Montgomeryshire – Francis Seymour-Conway, 1st Marquess of Hertford (from 20 April) 
Lord Lieutenant of Pembrokeshire – Sir William Owen, 4th Baronet (until 24 June); Sir Hugh Owen, 5th Baronet (from 24 June)
Lord Lieutenant of Radnorshire – Edward Harley, 4th Earl of Oxford and Earl Mortimer

Bishop of Bangor – John Moore
Bishop of Llandaff – Shute Barrington
Bishop of St Asaph – Jonathan Shipley
Bishop of St Davids – James Yorke

Events
19 April - Outbreak of the American Revolutionary War:
Anthony Bacon obtains munitions contracts for his ironworks.
Fort Belan built commanding the western end of the Menai Strait by Thomas Wynn.
8 September - An earthquake measuring 5.1 is felt in Swansea.
18 September - Dr Samuel Johnson accompanies Hester Thrale and her husband Henry on a visit to France.

Arts and literature

New books
Edward Evans - An Address delivered before the Association of Ministers at Dref Wen, near Newcastle Emlyn, with two Hymns
Elizabeth Griffith - The Morality of Shakespeare's Drama Illustrated
Nicholas Owen (attr.) - History of the Island of Anglesea

Music
Dafydd Jones - Hymnau a Chaniadau Ysprydol (hymns and psalms)
Morgan Rhys - Golwg o Ben Nebo, 3rd ed. (collection of hymns)
Edward Jones (Bardd y Brenin) arrives in London.

Births
22 February - John Hughes, minister, author and hymn-writer (died 1854)
7 May - John Parry, minister and author (died 1846)
25 November - Charles Kemble, actor (died 1854)
December - John Jones (Archdeacon of Merioneth), Anglican priest and writer (died 1834)
date unknown - John Roberts, Anglican priest and writer (died 1829)

Deaths
11 April - Roger Mostyn, Canon of Windsor, 54/55
12 April - William Vaughan (MP), politician, about 68
10 May - Caroline Matilda, queen consort of Sweden, daughter of Frederick, Prince of Wales, 23 (scarlet fever)
14 August - Sir Lynch Cotton, 4th Baronet, about 70

References

Wales
Wales